The Romance Tour was launched by Luis Miguel to some United States countries, Latin American and Spain to promote his album Romance. During this tour he made the first season of his career in Las Vegas, performing four nights at Circus Maximus Showroom of Caesars Palace. He played a concert in Seville during the Universal Exposition 1992, and in the National Auditorium in Mexico City, where he broke the World Record by selling the 10,000 tickets for his only show in 3 hours. Near the end of the tour, he had to postpone two concerts in Argentina to travel to Spain, due to the death of his father Luisito Rey.

Set List 

This set list is from the November 2, 1991, concert in Chicago. It is not intended to represent all concerts for this leg.

 "Introduction" 
 "Oro De Ley"
 "Yo Que No Vivo Sin Ti"
 "Amante Del Amor"
 "Pupilas De Gato" 
 "Hoy El Aire Huele A Ti"
 "Culpable O No"
 "Ahora Te Puedes Marchar"
 "Más Allá De Todo" 
 "Alguien Como Tú" (Somebody In Your Life)
 "Entrégate":
 "Fría Como el Viento" (Salsa version)
 "Renacer" (Gloria Estefan cover)
 "Tengo Todo Excepto a Ti"
 "Interlude" (Band)
 "Será Que No Me Amas"
 "La Barca" (with trio)
 "Mucho Corazón" (with trio)
 "De Que Manera Te Olvido" (with trio)
 "Un Hombre Busca Una Mujer" 
 "La Incondicional" 
 "Cuando Calienta El Sol" 

This set list is from the June 26, 1992, concert in Mexico City. It is not intended to represent all concerts for this leg.

 "Introduction" 
 "Oro De Ley"
 "Amante Del Amor"
 "Pupilas De Gato" 
 "Hoy El Aire Huele A Ti"
 "Ahora Te Puedes Marchar"
 "Alguien Como Tú"
 "Entrégate":
 "Tengo Todo Excepto a Ti"
 "Interlude" (Band)
 "Será Que No Me Amas"
 "No Me Platiques Más" 
 "Contigo En La Distancia" 
 "La Puerta" 
 "La Mentira" 
 "Cuando Vuelva A Tú Lado" 
 "No Sé Tú" 
 "Inolvidable" 
 "Un Hombre Busca Una Mujer" 
 "Cuando Calienta El Sol"

Tour dates 

Note: Some dates and venues are missing, and others may be wrong, due to the lack of reliable sources.

Box office score data

Cancelled shows

Band 
Vocals: Luis Miguel
Musical Director: Juan Carlos Toribio
Acoustic & electric guitar: Kiko Cibrian
Bass: Rudy Machorro
Piano & Keyboards: Juan Carlos Toribio
Keyboards: Arturo Pérez
Drums: Fernando Caballero
Percussion & Chorus: Alfredo Algarin
Saxophone: Jeff Nathanson
Trumpet: Juan Manuel Arpero
Trumpet: José Villar
Backing Vocals: Patricia Tanus, Eva María Bojalil
Trio: Los Pao

Notes

References

Luis Miguel concert tours
1991 concert tours
1992 concert tours